The Nuclear Institute for Agriculture and Biology, also known as NIAB, is an agriculture and food irradiation national research institute managed by the Pakistan Atomic Energy Commission. Along with Nuclear Institute for Food and Agriculture (NIFA), the NIAB reports directly to the PAEC Biological Science Directorate whose current member is Abdul Rashid. The current director is Dr.Muhammad Hamed, and it is located in Faisalabad, Punjab, Pakistan.

History
The NIAB was established by Ishrat Hussain Usmani when PAEC established its first Biological Science Directorate in 1965. In 1967, with the efforts led by dr. Abdus Salam, the Government approved a project, and Pakistan Atomic Energy Commission began its construction. The operations and research began in 1970, and it was officially inaugurated by Munir Ahmad Khan, then Chairman of the Pakistan Atomic Energy Commission, on April 6, 1972. Khan later developed the institute and led the research activities in the institution. The nuclear medical research was also put under Khan, and NIAB had developed 23 different crop varieties, which are high yielding; they are disease resistant and are being cultivated throughout the country.

At first, the institute was mandate to create and maintain new genetic material for sustained agriculture development and to conduct research on applied problems in the field of agriculture and biology using nuclear and other related techniques.

Facilities
The institute is equipped with well-equipped laboratories having facilities. The institute currently operates 60Co irradiation sources, gas chromatographs, Photo-documentation system, and atomic absorption.

References

External links
Official website

Energy in Pakistan
Nuclear technology in Pakistan
Pakistan federal departments and agencies
Science and technology in Pakistan
Project-706
Nuclear weapons programme of Pakistan
Nuclear organizations
Food safety organizations
Constituent institutions of Pakistan Atomic Energy Commission
Organisations based in Faisalabad
1972 establishments in Pakistan